Kōda (広田川, コウダガワ, Kōda-gawa) is a small river in the towns of Kōta and Nishio in Aichi Prefecture, Japan.

The town changed its name from Kōda (広田) to Kōta (幸田) in 1954, and for that reason, the river is sometimes called Kōta too.  The transliterations as Koda, Kouda, Kota, or Kouta may also occur, with or without the Japanese suffix gawa ("river").  Moreover, the kanji 広田 can also be read as Hirota, and this misreading seems to be commonly made by automatic translators.

References

Rivers of Aichi Prefecture
Rivers of Japan